Bündner Kunstmuseum (English: Graubünden Art Museum) is a Swiss art museum founded in 1919, and located in Chur, Switzerland.

About 
The Villa Planta building was formerly a house owned by Jacques Ambrosius von Planta (1826–1901), built from 1874 to 1876 and designed by architect Johannes Ludwig. Bündner Kunstmuseum was founded in 1919 in the Villa Planta by the Bündner Kunstverein (English: Graubünden Art Association). 

Around 1927, the natural history portion of the collection was moved next door in order to form the Natur- und Nationalpark-Museum (English: Nature and National Park Museum). From 1987 to 1990, the Villa Planta was remodeled by local architect collective Peter Zumthor, Peter Calonder, and Hans-Jörg Ruch. In 2016, the museum added a cube-shaped building extension with a gridded facade in cast concrete, designed by architects Barozzi Veiga. 

The museum art collection contains work by Graubünden-local artists, and includes Angelica Kauffmann, Augusto Giacometti, Giovanni Segantini, and Ernst Ludwig Kirchner. Since 1990, the Bündner Kunstmuseum has participated in the Manor Cultural Prize, which is awarded every two years for Swiss emerging artist representing the Canton of Graubünden.

References

External links 

 Official website

Art museums and galleries in Switzerland
Tourist attractions in Graubünden
Buildings and structures in Graubünden
1919 establishments in Switzerland